Ronald Lawrence Woods (born February 1, 1943) is an American former professional baseball player who appeared in all or part of six seasons in Major League Baseball from  to , primarily as an outfielder, for the Detroit Tigers, New York Yankees and Montreal Expos. He also played two seasons in Japan for the Chunichi Dragons in 1975–1976.

Woods graduated from Compton High School in Southern California, and entered pro baseball in the Pittsburgh Pirates' organization in June 1961. However, after five years in the Pittsburgh farm system, he had risen only as high as the Double-A level. Early in 1966, the Detroit Tigers acquired his contract. After a strong 1968 season with the Triple-A Toledo Mud Hens, Woods made the  roster of the defending World Series champion Tigers out of spring training. He appeared in 17 early-season games for Detroit, largely as a pinch hitter, pinch runner and defensive replacement, before being traded June 14 to the New York Yankees for veteran outfielder Tom Tresh.

Although he struggled offensively, Woods was able to solidify his hold on a major league job with the Yankees, appearing in 192 games (starting 147) from June 1969 to June . On June 25 of the latter year, the Yankees sent Woods to the Montreal Expos for former New York Mets outfielder Ron Swoboda. Despite a brief detour to Triple-A Winnipeg in 1971, Woods spent the next 3 years on the Expo roster, appearing in 373 games and batting a cumulative .245. In , he was Montreal's most-used center fielder, starting 72 games and platooning with left-handed hitters Boots Day and Jim Lyttle, as the Expos, a fifth-year expansion team, battled for the National League East Division title before falling short by 3 games. 

That off-season, however, the Expos traded for veteran center fielder Willie Davis of the Los Angeles Dodgers, relegating Woods to part-time status in 1974. He started 21 games all season, batted .205 in 127 at bats, and departed for the Chunichi Dragons of Nippon Professional Baseball. He played the 1975 and 1976 seasons in Japan, appearing in 192 total games and hitting .263 with 160 hits and 19 home runs.

Doing Woods' six seasons in the major leagues, Woods batted .233. His 290 hits in 1,247 at bats included 34 doubles, 12 triples, and 26 career home runs. He compiled 130 RBIs, and 27 stolen bases.

Sources

1943 births
Living people
20th-century African-American sportspeople
21st-century African-American people
African-American baseball players
American expatriate baseball players in Canada
American expatriate baseball players in Japan
Asheville Tourists players
Baseball players from California
Baseball players from Ohio
Batavia Pirates players
Chunichi Dragons players
Detroit Tigers players
Hobbs Pirates players
Kinston Eagles players
Major League Baseball outfielders
Montgomery Rebels players
Montreal Expos players
New York Yankees players
Rocky Mount Leafs players
Sportspeople from Compton, California
Sportspeople from Hamilton, Ohio
Toledo Mud Hens players
Winnipeg Whips players
Compton High School alumni